Padanian nationalism is an ideology and a regionalist movement demanding more autonomy or even independence from Italy, for Padania, a region encompassing Northern and, to some extent, part of central Italy.

Lega Nord, a federation of regional parties of Northern Italy, proclaimed the formation of the "Federal Republic of Padania" in 1996 and was the main political proponent of Padania nationalism until 2013, when the party shifted back toward federalism and regionalism, as well as adopting to some extent Italian nationalism, under Matteo Salvini's leadership. However, the party still includes Padanist factions and people, notably including founder and former leader Umberto Bossi.

Additionally, there have been some minor Padanian nationalist parties, such as Lega Padana, Lega Padana Lombardia/Padanian Union, the Alpine Padanian Union and the Padanian Independentist Movement, and Veneto Padanian Federal Republic.

There have been also some intellectuals, such as Gianfranco Miglio, Gilberto Oneto, Giancarlo Pagliarini and Leonardo Facco, who have continued to be keen Padanists, after breaking with Lega Nord. In January 2012 Gianluca Marchi, a former editor of La Padania, launched L'Indipendenza, an online newspaper, as the voice of independent Padanism and Padanian libertarianism. Oneto, Pagliarini and Facco were all contributing editors of it.

Padania and Lega Nord

Lega Nord unilaterally proclaimed the independence of Padania on 15 September 1996 in Venice, but since then has come back to its original federalist credo, although the party constitution continues to declare that the independence of Padania is the party's final goal. In that occasion Umberto Bossi, the leader of Lega Nord, while reading the Padanian Declaration of Independence, echoing the United States Declaration of Independence, proclaimed:

In the following years Lega Nord installed a non-recognized Padanian Parliament near Mantua, elected in self-organized elections and a government in Venice. Later, a "Parliament of the North" was established in Vicenza, but functioned merely as an internal structure of the party.

Lega Nord also proposed a flag, the Sun of the Alps, and a national anthem, the Va' Pensiero chorus from Giuseppe Verdi's Nabucco, in which the exiled Hebrew slaves lament for their lost homeland. The party also tried to expand its reach through a number of Padanian-styled associations and media endeavours (under the supervision of Davide Caparini), notably including La Padania daily, Il Sole delle Alpi weekly, the Lega Nord Flash periodical, the TelePadania TV channel, the Radio Padania Libera and the "Bruno Salvadori" publishing house. More recently the party stressed the independent status of Padania through sports and other activities: the Padania national football team took part and won 2008, 2009 and 2010 VIVA World Cup; the party also sponsored a beauty contest, Miss Padania.

Lega Nord's Padania

Opinion polling
While support for a federal system, as opposed to a centrally administered state, receives widespread consensus within Padania, support for independence is less favoured. One poll in 1996 estimated that 52.4% of interviewees from Northern Italy considered secession advantageous (vantaggiosa) and 23.2% both advantageous and desirable (auspicabile). Another poll in 2000 estimated that about 20% of "Padanians" (18.3% in North-West Italy and 27.4% in North-East Italy) supported secession in case Italy was not reformed into a federal state.

More recent polls show different results. According to a poll conducted in February 2010 by GPG, 45% of Northerners support the independence of Padania. A poll conducted by SWG in June 2010 puts that figure at 61% of Northerners (with 80% of them supporting at least federal reform), while noting that 55% of Italians consider Padania as only a political invention, against 42% believing in its real existence (45% of the sample being composed of Northerners, 19% of Central Italians and 36% of Southerners). As for federal reform, according to the poll, 58% of Italians support it. A more recent poll by SWG puts the support for fiscal federalism and secession respectively at 68% and 37% in Piedmont and Liguria, 77% and 46% in Lombardy, 81% and 55% in Triveneto (comprising Veneto), 63% and 31% in Emilia-Romagna, 51% and 19% in Central Italy (not including Lazio).

Bibliography
Gianfranco Miglio, Come cambiare. Le mie riforme, Mondadori, Milan 1992
Gianfranco Miglio, Henry David Thoreau, Disobbedienza civile, Mondadori, Milan 1993
Gianfranco Miglio, Italia 1996: così è andata a finire, Mondadori, Milan 1993
Gianfranco Miglio, Io, Bossi e la Lega, Mondadori, Milan 1994
Gianfranco Miglio, La Costituzione federale, Mondadori, Milan 1995
Gianfranco Miglio, Marcello Veneziani, Padania, Italia. Lo Stato nazionale è soltanto in crisi o non è mai esistito?, Le Lettere, Florence 1997
Gianfranco Miglio, Augusto Barbera, Federalismo e secessione. Un dialogo, Mondatori, Milan 1997
Gianfranco Miglio, Federalismi falsi e degenerati, Sperling & Kupfer, Milan 1997
Gianfranco Miglio, L'asino di Buridano, Neri Pozza, Vicenza 1999
Gilberto Oneto, Bandiere di libertà: Simboli e vessilli dei Popoli dell'Italia settentrionale, FdF, Milan 1992
Gilberto Oneto, Pianificazione del territorio, federalismo e autonomie locali, Alinea, Florence 1994
Gilberto Oneto, L'invenzione della Padania, Foedus Editore, Ceresola (BG) 1997
Gilberto Oneto, Giancarlo Pagliarini, 50 buone ragioni per l'Indipendenza, La Padania, Milan 1998
Gilberto Oneto, Piccolo è libero, Leonardo Facco Editore, Treviglio (BG) 2005
Gilberto Oneto, L' iperitaliano. Eroe o cialtrone? Biografia senza censure di Giuseppe Garibaldi, Il Cerchio, Rimini 2006

References